Lezhë Castle (Albanian:Kalaja e Lezhës) is a castle dominating the city of Lezhë, northern Albania.
Lezhë Castle began from illyrian fortifiations. It was rebuilt by the Venetians in the 1440s and the Ottomans in 1522. In the late Middle Ages, the castle belonged to the Dukagjini family. The two brothers Tanush Thopia and Progon Dukagjini (sons of Lekë I) through an agreement which preserved their trade rights and estates around the castle placed the city and the castle under Venetian control in 1393 as a means to defend it against Ottoman expansion. The Venetians formally ceded the castle to the Ottomans in 1506.

See also 
 Lezhë
 List of castles in Albania

References

Sources

External links

Buildings and structures completed in 1440
Infrastructure completed in 1522
Castles in Albania
Illyrian architecture
Buildings and structures in Lezhë
1522 establishments in the Ottoman Empire
Tourist attractions in Lezhë County